Hooghly or Hughli can refer to:

Places
Hooghly, West Bengal, colonial port town now part of Hugli-Chinsura
Hooghly district, established 1795, containing the above town
Hooghly (Lok Sabha constituency)
Hooghly River

Ships
Hooghly (1819 ship), a British merchant ship, launched in 1819
Hooghly-class fuel barge, watercraft of the Indian Navy
HMIS Hooghly (K330), an Indian pilot vessel and former Canadian frigate